The Tar Heel Warrior is a 1917 American silent drama film directed by E. Mason Hopper and starring Walt Whitman, Ann Forrest and William Shaw.

Cast
 Walt Whitman as Col. Dabney Mills
 Ann Forrest as Betty Malroy 
 William Shaw as Paul Darrell
 James McLaughlin as James Adams 
 Dorcas Matthews as Anna Belle Adams
 George West as Uncle Tobe
 Clara Knight as Aunt Tillie
 J.P. Lockney as Lemuel L.Burke 
 Wilbur Higby as John Mason
 Tom Guise as Major Amos

References

Bibliography
 Robert B. Connelly. The Silents: Silent Feature Films, 1910-36, Volume 40, Issue 2. December Press, 1998.

External links
 

1917 films
1917 drama films
1910s English-language films
American silent feature films
Silent American drama films
American black-and-white films
Triangle Film Corporation films
Films directed by E. Mason Hopper
1910s American films
English-language drama films